Seyyed Mehdi Tabatabaei Shirazi (March 21, 1936 — May 17, 2018) was an Iranian Shia cleric and conservative politician who served as member of the Parliament of Iran from 2004 to 2008, representing the districts of Tehran, Rey, Shemiranat and Eslamshahr. He represented Mashhad and Kalat from 1984 to 1988. 

Tabatabaei had been described as a "well-known moderate conservative cleric".

Views 
Tabatabaei was a critic of Mahmoud Ahmadinejad, and a supporter of the Iran deal. 

In 2009, he said he wished he had died and not seen the post-election incidents in Iran.

References

1936 births
2018 deaths
Members of the 2nd Islamic Consultative Assembly
Members of the 7th Islamic Consultative Assembly
Deputies of Mashhad and Kalat
Deputies of Tehran, Rey, Shemiranat and Eslamshahr
Combatant Clergy Association politicians
Alliance of Builders of Islamic Iran politicians
Fada'iyan-e Islam members
People from Rafsanjan